Brazilian Footballer of the Year may refer to:

Bola de Ouro, an award given each year, since 1973, by the Brazilian magazine Placar
Prêmio Craque do Brasileirão, an award given each year, since 2005, by the Brazilian Football Confederation and Rede Globo